Stephen Henderson Talbot (born February 28, 1949) is an American TV documentary producer, reporter, writer, and longtime contributor to the Public Broadcasting Service (PBS) and the series Frontline. His more than 40 documentaries include the Frontline films "The Best Campaign Money Can Buy", "Rush Limbaugh's America", "The Long March of Newt Gingrich", "Justice for Sale", and "News War: What's Happening to the News". Talbot has also written and produced PBS biographies of writers Dashiell Hammett, Beryl Markham, Ken Kesey, Carlos Fuentes, Maxine Hong Kingston and John Dos Passos. He was co-creator and executive producer of the PBS music specials, Sound Tracks: Music Without Borders".

He began his career in broadcast journalism as a reporter and producer at KQED-TV in San Francisco, where he also contributed feature news stories to the MacNeil/Lehrer NewsHour. Talbot has worked as a producer and senior producer for the Center for Investigative Reporting and for ITVS and the PBS series, Independent Lens.

Before becoming a journalist and documentary producer, Talbot was a television child actor in the late 1950s and early 1960s. He is known for his role in the TV sitcom Leave It to Beaver, in which he played Gilbert Bates, friend of Theodore "Beaver" Cleaver (Jerry Mathers).

Early life and education
Born in Hollywood and raised in Studio City, California, Stephen Talbot is the son of Lyle Talbot, a film and TV actor, and Paula Talbot (born Margaret Epple). Stephen graduated in 1966 from Harvard High School in Studio City (now called Harvard-Westlake).

In 1970, he graduated from Wesleyan University in Connecticut, where he studied English and film. He was also very active in anti-Vietnam War protests. He began making films about the anti-war movement, including the November 1969 March on Washington, DC III (about Vietnam Veterans Against the War), and Year of the Tiger (filmed in Vietnam).

From 1970 to 1973, he worked at the State University of New York College at Old Westbury, then an experimental college on Long Island. He began as assistant to the school's president and subsequently became a lecturer in the American Studies program.

Acting career
Talbot's first appearance as Gilbert on Leave It to Beaver was in a 1959 episode called "Beaver and Gilbert", in which he played an insecure new kid in town who is prone to telling tall tales. Early in the series, Gilbert frequently got the hapless Beaver into trouble. But as the series developed, Gilbert became a more genuine friend of the Beav.

Talbot guest-starred on many television programs in the late 1950s and early 1960s, including three episodes of Lassie. He appeared in two episodes of The Twilight Zone: "Static" and "The Fugitive". In 1960, he played Jimmie Kendall, son of the title character in CBS's Perry Mason in the episode, "The Case of the Wandering Widow".

Talbot also appeared in M Squad, The Barbara Stanwyck Show, The Blue Angels, Men Into Space, Lawman, Wanted: Dead or Alive, Law of the Plainsman, The Donna Reed Show, Mr. Novak and The Lucy Show. He appeared in comedy sketches with Bob Newhart in the early '60s NBC variety program, The Bob Newhart Show. Talbot played the role of Ronnie Kramer in the CBS's anthology series The DuPont Show with June Allyson episode "Hit and Run".

On stage, Talbot co-starred as "Sonny" in William Inge's Dark at the Top of the Stairs with Marjorie Lord at the La Jolla Playhouse.

He also played Dick Clark's ward and nephew in Clark's first movie, Because They're Young (1960). The high school melodrama also starred Tuesday Weld and had music by "rock 'n roller" Duane Eddy.

Having spent his early years in front of the cameras, Talbot abandoned acting for a career as a journalist. In an article for Salon.com in 1997, he looked back with a sense of humor about his past role on "Beaver":

In the interests of historical accuracy I should say that, yes, Gilbert was a troublemaker and an occasional liar, but my character was certainly no Eddie Haskell – that leering teenage hypocrite who spoke unctuously to parents ("Well, hello Mrs. Cleaver, and how is young Theodore today?") and venomously to the Beav ("Hey, squirt, take a powder before I squash you like a bug").... I have spent my adult life trying to conceal my Leave It to Beaver past or correcting the historical record. Either way the series has become inescapable. When I was a kid, I loved acting; in fact, I badgered my father and mother until they allowed me to work. But how could I have known as an innocent 9-year-old that I was taking part in a television program that would live on for 40 years as an icon for baby boomers? In the early '80s, I turned down an offer to revive my role as Gilbert in a Beaver reunion series. "I'm trying to establish myself as a documentary filmmaker and an investigative reporter," I explained to the producers. "I can't go back to being Gilbert."

More recently Talbot reflected affectionately on his Beaver experience in articles and interviews and even in a Frontline documentary, "Diet Wars."https://www.youtube.com/watch?v=j_NPvsHHaJU |title=The Beaver and Gilbert Reunite

KQED
In the 1980s, Talbot was a staff reporter and producer at KQED-TV, the PBS affiliate in San Francisco.

Early in his career at KQED, Talbot produced two national PBS Peabody Award winners, Broken Arrow, about nuclear weapons accidents, and The Case of Dashiell Hammett, a biography of the crime writer.

During his time at KQED, Talbot produced local documentaries, as well as national PBS documentaries such as Namibia: Behind the Lines, South Africa Under Siege (a portrait of Nelson Mandela's ANC in exile), and The Gospel and Guatemala (an investigation with Elizabeth Farnsworth  of Guatemala's presidential strongman Efraín Ríos Montt and his "born again" U.S. supporters).

He also wrote and produced (or co-produced with Joan Saffa and Judy Flannery) several hour-long PBS biographies of noted writers, including: Dashiell Hammett, Ken Kesey, Beryl Markham, Carlos Fuentes, and Maxine Hong Kingston.

At KQED, Talbot reported and produced dozens of feature news stories for The MacNeil/Lehrer Newshour.

After leaving KQED in 1989, Talbot produced and co-wrote a PBS biography of John Dos Passos narrated by newsman Robert MacNeil and actor William Hurt.

Talbot has returned to KQED over the years to produce documentary specials. In 1991, he investigated the May 1990 car bomb explosion in Oakland, California that nearly killed Earth First! environmental activists Judi Bari and Darryl Cherney. Talbot's documentary, Who Bombed Judi Bari?, critiqued the FBI and Oakland Police Department's charges against her and Cherney, and raised questions about who was actually responsible for placing the pipe bomb in her car. Returning again to KQED in 2001, Talbot wrote and produced a one-hour documentary about Jerry Brown as mayor of Oakland, The Celebrity and the City. He had previously produced a KQED documentary about San Francisco Mayor Art Agnos, "The Art of Being Mayor."

Frontline
Talbot has had a long association with Frontline, beginning with his documentary on the financing of the 1992 presidential campaign, The Best Campaign Money Can Buy. It won a DuPont Award. He continued such projects through 2007 with his documentary on the media, News War: What's Happening to the News.

His other Frontline news documentaries include "The Heartbeat of America" (an investigation of General Motors), "Public Lands, Private Profits" (about gold mining on federal land in the West), "Rush Limbaugh's America", "The Long March of Newt Gingrich", "Why America Hates the Press", "Spying on Saddam", "Justice for Sale", and "The Battle Over School Choice".

His "investigative biography" of Newt Gingrich – "The Long March of Newt Gingrich" (1995) – drew renewed interest and was posted with updates on the Frontline website in 2012 when Gingrich made an unsuccessful bid for the Republican presidential nomination.

In 2002, Frontline's executive producer David Fanning named Talbot as series editor of Frontline World, Frontline's international news magazine series. Between 2002 and 2008, Talbot oversaw the editorial content of 30 hour-long television episodes and helped commission and supervise nearly 100 broadcast stories.

With colleague Sharon Tiller, Talbot also oversaw the Frontline World website and its Emmy Award and Webby Award-winning online video series, Rough CutsBased at UC Berkeley's Graduate School of Journalism, Talbot and Tiller taught classes and helped identify and mentor the "next generation of video journalists" whose work was showcased on Frontline/World.

With reporter Kate Seelye, Talbot also produced a half-hour FRONTLINE/World story, "The Earthquake", about political turmoil in Lebanon and Syria. He was senior producer of the Emmy-winning FRONTLINE/World documentary by Gwynne Roberts, Iraq: Saddam's Road to Hell, an investigation of a massacre of Kurds carried out by Saddam Hussein's regime.Frontline World won the 2004 Overseas Press Club of America award for best international TV reporting.

 Sound Tracks 
Talbot was the co-creator and executive producer of Sound Tracks: Music Without Borders, a national PBS music show with host/reporter Marco Werman and reporters Alexis Bloom, Arun Rath and Mirissa Neff. The pilot episode was presented to PBS by Oregon Public Broadcasting, airing in 2010 with stories about the Russian propaganda song "A Man like Putin," Afrobeat legend Fela Kuti, and Borat music composer Erran Baron Cohen, and a performance by fado singer Mariza.

A second one-hour episode hosted by KQED aired nationally in 2012 with Wynton Marsalis, Youssou N'Dour, Julie Fowlis and Of Monsters and Men.

Talbot was also the executive producer of a series of twenty Sound Tracks online music videos for PBS Digital and YouTube, including interviews with and performances by Levon Helm, Yuja Wang, Hélène Grimaud, KT Tunstall, Seun Kuti, Seu Jorge, Anoushka Shankar and Of Monsters and Men.

Writing

Talbot's articles have appeared in Salon.com, the Washington Post Magazine, The Nation, Mother Jones, Rolling Stone, the San Francisco Chronicle, and the Los Angeles Times. Talbot wrote about meeting and interviewing Zimbabwe's Robert Mugabe in an article, "From Liberator to Tyrant," for the Frontline/World website.

In the 1970s, he was a reporter, writer and editor for Internews and the International Bulletin, a radio and print foreign news service based in Berkeley, California.

 Public Broadcasting Service (PBS) and freelance production 
For Oregon Public Broadcasting and PBS, Talbot wrote and directed with David Davis, The Sixties: The Years That Shaped a Generation, a two-hour history special that aired nationally on PBS in 2005. It drew from his earlier film, 1968: The Year That Shaped a Generation (1998).

He has executive produced a number of indie documentaries, including The Price of Sex, a documentary by director and photo journalist Mimi Chakarova about sex trafficking in Eastern Europe and the Middle East. Chakarova won the 2011 Nestor Almendros Award for courage in filmmaking from the Human Rights Watch Film Festival in New York and the Daniel Pearl Award from the International Consortium of Investigative Journalists.

Talbot wrote the one-hour political biography, Moscone: A Legacy of Change (2018), about San Francisco Mayor George Moscone, "the people's mayor" who was assassinated in 1978 along with gay Supervisor Harvey Milk.

From 2012 to 2014, Talbot was senior producer for video projects at the Center for Investigative Reporting, including feature news stories and short documentaries for the PBS Newshour, Univision, KQED-TV in San Francisco, and The New York Times. At CIR, Talbot also led the editorial team that created and ran "The I Files", the first investigative news channel on YouTube.com.

From 2015 to 2022, Talbot was senior producer for documentary shorts at ITVS / Independent Lens (PBS) in San Francisco.

In 2019 Talbot began co-writing and co-producing with Christine Ni the San Francisco Bay Area NBC series Bay Area Revelations, narrated by Peter Coyote. He started with the episodes "Exploring Space" and "Loma Prieta Earthquake, 30 Years Later". He continued in 2020 with "Female Sports Icons" and "Riding the Waves", about surfing in Northern California.

Talbot is directing a feature documentary for PBS about a showdown between the anti-Vietnam war movement and the Nixon and Kissinger administration in 1969, The Movement and the 'Madman'.Personal life
Stephen Talbot lives in San Francisco with his wife, Pippa Gordon, a medical social worker. They named their son Dashiell, now an attorney, after San Francisco mystery writer Dashiell Hammett. Their daughter, Caitlin, graduated with an M.F.A. from American Conservatory Theater, in San Francisco. In 2015, he wrote a story, "Call the Midwife", reminiscing about the home birth of his daughter.

Talbot's sister, New Yorker magazine staffer Margaret Talbot, wrote The Entertainer: Movies, Magic and My Father's Twentieth Century (Riverhead Books, 2012), about their father, Lyle Talbot, and their family history. His younger brother, David Talbot, is the author of several books, including Season of the Witch (about San Francisco in the 1960s and 1970s), and was the founder and original editor-in-chief of Salon.com. His sister, Cynthia, is a medical doctor in Portland, Oregon. His nephew, Joe Talbot, won the Best Director prize at Sundance for his debut feature film, The Last Black Man in San Francisco'' (2019).

Awards
Talbot has won numerous awards for his broadcast journalism, including two national News and Documentary Emmy Awards, three Peabody Awards, two DuPont-Columbia Journalism Silver Batons, a George Polk Award, six regional (Northern California) Emmys, three Golden Gate Awards from the San Francisco International Film Festival, three Thomas M. Storke International Journalism Awards from the World Affairs Council of Northern California, an Edward R. Murrow Award from the Overseas Press Club of America, a First Prize TV Award from the Education Writers Association, a National Press Club Arthur Rowse Award for media criticism, and an Edgar Allan Poe Award from the Mystery Writers of America. He has been nominated three times for best documentary script writing by the Writers Guild of America.

Select filmography
See the complete Stephen Talbot filmography at IMDB

References

External links

Official PBS site for "Sound Tracks: Music Without Borders"
"Sound Tracks Presents Quick Hits" YouTube Channel
 "Sound Tracks: Music Without Borders" website
"Frontline World" website
 "Frontline" website
"Price of Sex" film website
"Reveal News / Center for Investigative Reporting
KQED interview on the death of writer Carlos Fuentes. 2012
KQED interview on the life and legacy of San Francisco Mayor George Moscone. 2018
KQED interview on the 30th anniversary of the 1989 Loma Prieta earthquake. 2019
Whatever Happened to Stephen Talbot, "Leave it to Beaver"'s Gilbert? We Asked Him!
 https://bestclassicbands.com/stephen-talbot-beaver-interview-5-11-22/

1949 births
Living people
American male journalists
Journalists from California
Television producers from California
American male child actors
Wesleyan University alumni
People from Greater Los Angeles
People from the San Francisco Bay Area
Harvard-Westlake School alumni